Willkarana (Aymara willka sun, -rana near, "near the sun",  Hispanicized spelling Vilcarana) is a  mountain in the north of the Wansu mountain range in the Andes of Peru. It is situated in the Apurímac Region, Antabamba Province, Oropesa District.

References 

Mountains of Peru
Mountains of Apurímac Region